Nay Lin Aung is a Burmese politician  who currently serves as a Pyithu Hluttaw MP for Mindat Township.

Early life
Nay was born on 27 November 1976 in Mindat, Myanmar. He graduated B.A(History) from Monywa University.

Political career
He is a member of the National League for Democracy. In the 2015 Myanmar general election, he was elected as Pyithu Hluttaw MP, winning a majority of 8216 votes and elected  representative from Mindat Township parliamentary constituency.

References 

1976 births
Living people
People from Chin State
Members of Pyithu Hluttaw
National League for Democracy politicians
Monywa University alumni